Poecilostomatoida are an suborder of copepods. Although it was previously considered a separate order, recent research showed it to be nested within the Cyclopoida

Description
The classification of these copepods has been established on the basis of the structure of the mouth. In poecilostomatoids the mouth is represented by a transverse slit, partially covered by the overhanging labrum which resembles an upper lip. Although there is variability in the form of the mandible among poecilostomatoids, it can be generalized as being falcate (sickle-shaped).

The antennules are frequently reduced in size and the antennae modified to terminate in small hooks or claws that are used in attachment to host organisms.

Life cycle
As with many crustaceans, larval development is metamorphic with immature forms differing greatly from those of adults. Embryos are carried in paired or single sacs attached to first abdominal somite (as seen in the illustration of the female Sapphirina darwinii above right).

Ecology
Most poecilostomatoid copepods are ectoparasites of saltwater fish or invertebrates (including among the latter mollusks and echinoderms). They usually attach to the external surface of the host, in the throat-mouth cavity, or the gills. One family of poecilostomatoid copepods, however, have evolved an endoparasitic mode of life and live deep within their hosts' bodies rather than merely attaching themselves to exterior and semi-exterior surface tissue.

In addition to typical marine environments, poecilostomatoid copepods may be found in such very particular habitats as anchialine caves and deep sea vents (both hydrothermal vents and cold seeps). Here, many primitive associated copepods belonging to the Poecilostomatoida and Siphonostomatoida and have been found. Representatives of one Poecilostomatoida family have successfully made the transition to freshwater habitats and host animals therein.

List of families
There are over sixty families currently recognized within the group:

Abrsiidae
Anchimolgidae
Anomoclausiidae
Antheacheridae
Anthessiidae
Bomolochidae
Bradophilidae
Catiniidae
Chondracanthidae
Clausidiidae
Clausiidae
Corallovexiidae
Corycaeidae
Echiurophilidae
Entobiidae
Erebonasteridae
Ergasilidae
Eunicicolidae
Gadilicolidae
Gastrodelphyidae
Herpyllobiidae
Intramolgidae
Iveidae
Jasmineiricolidae
Kelleriidae
Lamippidae
Leaniricolidae
Lichomolgidae
Lubbockiidae
Macrochironidae
Makrostrotidae
Mesoglicolidae
Myicolidae
Mytilicolidae
Nereicolidae
Octopicolidae
Oncaeidae
Paralubbockiidae
Philichthyidae
Philoblennidae
Phyllodicolidae
Pionodesmotidae
Polyankyliidae
Pseudanthessiidae
Rhynchomolgidae
Sabelliphilidae
Saccopsidae
Sapphirinidae
Serpulidicolidae
Shiinoidae
Spiophanicolidae
Splanchnotrophidae
Strepidae
Synapticolidae
Synaptiphilidae
Taeniacanthidae
Telsidae
Thamnomolgidae
Tuccidae
Umazurcolidae
Urocopiidae
Vahiniidae
Ventriculinidae
Xarifiidae
Xenocoelomatidae

References

External links

 
Copepods
Arthropod suborders